John Thomas Howell (born April 28, 1978) is a former American football safety in the National Football League (NFL). He played professionally for the Tampa Bay Buccaneers and Seattle Seahawks.

Early life
Howell was born in North Platte, Nebraska, and attended Mullen High School in Mullen, Nebraska. He was a letterman in American football, wrestling, track and field, and golf. In football, he was a two-time first-team All-Conference honoree, and as a senior, he was an All-State honorable mention selection. In wrestling, he was a state runner-up as a junior and as a senior, won the Nebraska State Championship.

College
Howell played college football at Colorado State University, and attended the university on a football scholarship.

Professional career
Howell was drafted by the Tampa Bay Buccaneers in the fourth round of the 2001 NFL Draft. He played four seasons with the Tampa Bay Buccaneers, including Super Bowl XXXVII in 2002. Howell signed with the Seattle Seahawks for the 2006 season. He suffered a season-ending hamstring injury in the 2006 Seahawks' playoff game against the Dallas Cowboys and was waived shortly thereafter.

Personal life
Howell lives in Colorado with his wife, Laura, and their three children. His daughter Jaelin is a soccer player. His son Jack is a safety for Colorado State.

Howell is an avid hunter. He is active with organizations such as Safari Club International, the Dallas Safari Club, and the National Rifle Association. In 2007, he co-founded Dismal River Outfitters, a hunting ranch and resort in Mullen, Nebraska, with his former Buccaneer and Seahawk teammate, Joe Jurevicius.

See also
 Waivers (American football)
 List of Seattle Seahawks players

References

External links
 databaseFootball.com
 SI.com
 Pro-Football-Reference.Com
 Dismal River Outfitters

1978 births
Living people
American football safeties
American hunters
American sports businesspeople
Colorado State Rams football players
People from Hooker County, Nebraska
People from North Platte, Nebraska
Seattle Seahawks players
Tampa Bay Buccaneers players